The women's 100 metre breaststroke event at the 1968 Summer Olympics took place between 18 and 19 October. This swimming event used the breaststroke. Because an Olympic size swimming pool is 50 metres long, this race consisted of two lengths of the pool. This was the first appearance for this event in the Olympics for the women swimmers.

American Katie Ball was the favorite to win three gold medals at the 1968 Olympics. She was the reigning world record holder in all four breaststroke distances and bettered her own world records in the 100-meter and 200-meter breaststroke at the U.S. Olympic Trials in August 1968.  She arrived at the 1968 Summer Olympics in Mexico City, however, with a case of influenza.  She won her only Olympic medal, a gold, as a member of the winning U.S. 4×100-meter medley relay team by swimming the breaststroke leg of the four-person relay.  Sharing the gold medal honors were her relay teammates Kaye Hall (backstroke), Ellie Daniel (butterfly) and Susan Pedersen (freestyle).  In the 100-meter breaststroke final, Ball led close to the finish but physical exhaustion overwhelmed her, and she finished fifth.  She was too ill to swim in the subsequent preliminary heats of the 200-meter breaststroke and was scratched from the event.

Medalists

Results

Heats
Heat 1

Heat 2

Heat 3

Heat 4

Heat 5

Semifinals
Heat 1

Heat 2

Final

Key: OR = Olympic record

References

External links
1968 Summer Olympics results: Women's 100 m breaststroke, from http://library.la84.org/; retrieved 2016-04-02.

Women's breaststroke 100 metre
1968 in women's swimming
Women's events at the 1968 Summer Olympics